John Herbert Dirks  (born August 20, 1933) is a Canadian physician.

Overview 
Born to a Mennonite family in Winnipeg, Manitoba, Dirks studied medicine at the University of Manitoba and received a fellowship in medicine from the Royal College of Physicians in 1963. From 1963 to 1965, Dirks trained in nephrology research at the National Institutes of Health. He then became the head of the nephrology division at the Royal Victoria Hospital. In 1976, Dirks became head of the Department of Medicine at the University of British Columbia and, in 1987, Dean of Medicine at the University of Toronto. From 1994 to 1996, he was Dean-Rector at the Aga Khan University in Pakistan. in 1993, he became president and scientific director at the Gairdner Foundation and also serves as chair of the Medical Advisory Board and of the Canada Gairdner Wightman Committee for the foundation.

Dirks was named to the Canadian Medical Hall of Fame in 2012. He was named to the Order of Canada in 2006.

References 

1933 births
Living people
Canadian nephrologists
Members of the Order of Canada
University of Manitoba alumni
Canadian Mennonites